The 1978 Whippoorwill tornado, also known as the Whippoorwill Disaster was a tornado that struck on June 17, 1978. In the United States, the 1978 Whippoorwill tornado is the deadliest F1 rated tornado on the Fujita Scale.

Storm history
The tornado formed at 7 p.m. (CST) and moved erratically eastward for 8 miles before dissipating near the small town of Michigan Valley. The tornado was too small to be detected on radar, and eyewitnesses stated that the tornado was only 150 yards wide but had a multiple vortex structure. Some reported another tornado in the area although it was not confirmed by the National Weather Service.

Impact
At the time of the tornado, the National Weather Service issued a severe thunderstorm watch for Franklin County, Kansas. At the same time, the showboat, Whippoorwill left its mooring at Pomona Lake carrying 58 passengers and crew. Eyewitnesses of the disaster stated that they saw the tornado forming at the west end of the lake. The tornado strengthened as it raced toward the boat. The tornado struck the boat and capsized it before moving on to land.

After the tornado moved away, rescuers began to pick survivors off from the hull of the capsized ship. One rescuer, the owner of Lighthouse Bay Marina, and diver, Lawrence Stadel, dove under the boat and found two more survivors, trapped in air pockets. The tornado that capsized the boat later caused minimal damage to mobile homes before dissipating. In total, 16 people were killed in the incident, including three faculty members from the Emporia State University School of Library and Information Management.

Aftermath
After the disaster, the owners of the ship closed down their dinner theater a few years after the disaster. The Whippoorwill itself was repaired and converted into a houseboat dubbed Georgia May. In 2005, while docked in shallow water, a small fire caused the boat to sink. It was then towed to a spot near Vassar, Kansas and left to rust. The boat was eventually sold in 2016 to two brothers, Matt and Josh Abramovitz, who intend to repair it and put it back into service by offering day cruises.

See also
Tornado
List of North American tornadoes and tornado outbreaks
Tornadoes of 1978

References

F0 and F1 tornadoes
Tornadoes of 1978
Tornadoes in Kansas
Maritime incidents in 1978
1978 natural disasters in the United States
Whippoorwill tornado
June 1978 events in the United States